Joseph Henry Gordon (May 15, 1928, in Boston, Massachusetts – November 4, 1963, in Santa Monica, California) was an American jazz trumpeter.

His first professional gigs were in Boston in 1947; he played with Georgie Auld, Charlie Mariano, Lionel Hampton, Charlie Parker (1952–55 intermittently), Art Blakey (1954), and Don Redman.

In 1956 he toured the Middle East with Dizzy Gillespie's big band; he was a soloist on "A Night in Tunisia". Following this he played with Horace Silver.

After moving to Los Angeles, he recorded with Barney Kessel, Benny Carter, Harold Land, Shelly Manne (1958–60) and Dexter Gordon.

He recorded as a bandleader for two sessions, and appeared on one recording with Thelonious Monk.

He has an uncredited role playing in Paul Horn's jazz band in the film Night Tide.

He died in a house fire on November 4, 1963.

Discography

As leader
1955: Introducing Joe Gordon (EmArcy)
1961: Lookin' Good! (Contemporary)

As sideman
With Art Blakey
Blakey (EmArcy, 1954)
With Donald Byrd
Byrd's Eye View (Transition, 1955)
With Benny Carter
Aspects (United Artists, 1959)
With Charlie Parker
Boston - 1952 (Uptown Records, 1952)
With Dizzy Gillespie
World Statesman (Norgran, 1956)
Dizzy in Greece (Verve, 1957)
With Barney Kessel
Some Like It Hot (Contemporary, 1959)
With Harold Land
West Coast Blues! (Jazzland, 1960)
With Charlie Mariano
The New Sounds From Boston (Prestige, 1951)
Charlie Mariano Boston All Stars (Prestige, 1953) reissued on CD with New Sounds
With Shelly Manne
Son of Gunn!! (Contemporary, 1959)
At the Black Hawk 1 (Contemporary, 1959)
At the Black Hawk 2 (Contemporary, 1959)
At the Black Hawk 3 (Contemporary, 1959)
At the Black Hawk 4 (Contemporary, 1959)
At the Black Hawk 5 (Contemporary, 1959 [1991])
Shelly Manne & His Men J.A.T.P./ Yesterdays (Pablo, 1960, Release 2003)
The Proper Time (Contemporary, 1961)
With Thelonious Monk
Thelonious Monk at the Blackhawk - with Charlie Rouse and Harold Land (Riverside, 1960) 
With Herb Pomeroy
Life Is a Many Splendored Gig (Roulette, 1957)
With Helen Humes
Swingin' with Humes (Contemporary, 1961)
With Horace Silver
Silver's Blue (Columbia, 1956)
With Jimmy Woods
Awakening!! (Contemporary, 1962)
With June Christy and Bob Cooper
Do-Re-Mi (June Christy and Bob Cooper album) (Capitol Records, 1961)
With Various Artists
West Coast Days - Live At The Lighthouse (Fresh Sound)

References

External links
New England Jazz History Database
Scott Yanow, [ Joe Gordon] at Allmusic

1928 births
1963 deaths
American jazz trumpeters
American male trumpeters
Jazz musicians from Massachusetts
Mercury Records artists
Contemporary Records artists
Deaths from fire in the United States
20th-century American musicians
20th-century trumpeters
20th-century American male musicians
American male jazz musicians